"Praise You" is a song by British big beat musician Fatboy Slim. It was released as the third single from his second studio album, You've Come a Long Way, Baby (1998), on 4 January 1999. It reached number one on the UK Singles Chart and in Iceland, number four in Canada, number six in Ireland, and number 36 in the United States. As of 1999, it had sold over 150,000 units in the US.

Samples
A total of six samples are used in the song. The song features a prominent vocal sample from the opening of "Take Yo' Praise" by Camille Yarbrough, as well as a prominent piano sample from the track "Balance and Rehearsal" from a test album entitled Sessions released by audio electronics company JBL. The song also features a guitar sample from the opening of "It's a Small World" from the Disneyland Records-released album Mickey Mouse Disco, the theme from the cartoon series Fat Albert and the Cosby Kids, the electric piano riff from "Lucky Man" by Steve Miller Band, and the drum beat from "Running Back To Me" by Tom Fogerty.

In a 2021 interview with the website WhoSampled, Yarbrough said that she liked "Praise You" and its use of her vocals, feeling that Cook kept the essence of "Take Yo' Praise".

Music video
The accompanying video for "Praise You" was directed by Spike Jonze with Roman Coppola. Jonze starred in the film, under the pseudonym Richard Koufey, along with a fictional dance group: The Torrance Community Dance Group. The video intro described it as "A Torrance Public Film Production".

The video was shot guerrilla-style – that is, on location without obtaining permission from the owners of the property – in front of puzzled onlookers outside the Fox Bruin Theater in Westwood, Los Angeles, California. In the video, a heavily disguised Jonze and the dance group, acting as a flash mob, dance to "Praise You", much to the chagrin of a theatre employee who turns off their portable stereo. One of the actor-dancers in the fictional dance group, Michael Gier, documented the making of the "Praise You" video on his website.

The "Praise You" video was made only because Jonze, unable to work with Fatboy Slim on the video for "The Rockafeller Skank", recorded and sent his own solo dance video of "Skank" as a gift; Jonze's 'alternative' music video was so well received by Cook that Jonze's fictional Torrance Community Dance Group was green-lighted for the official video for "Praise You". Cook has said he liked this music video more so than The Rockafeller Skank's, which he hated.

Cook himself is briefly seen in the video as one of the many onlookers, with the clearest view shown at the conclusion of the video, while Jonze claims his "b-boy moves" came from living in New York. Cook curiously peers over Jonze to catch a glimpse of the camera before walking off to the right.

The video reportedly cost only US$800 to produce.

The video won three major awards at the 1999 MTV Video Music Awards: Breakthrough Video, Best Direction (awarded to "Torrance Community Dance Group"), and Best Choreography (awarded to "Richard Koufey & Michael Rooney"). It was also nominated for, but did not win, Best Dance Video. The group also put on a dance performance to the song at the awards. In 2001, it was voted number one of the 100 best videos of all time, in a poll to mark the 20th anniversary of MTV.

|-
| align="center" rowspan="5" | 1999
| align="center" rowspan="4" | MTV Video Music Award
| align="center" | Best Dance Video
| 
|-
| align="center" | Breakthrough Video
| 
|-
| align="center" | Best Direction
| 
|-
| align="center" | Best Choreography
| 
|-
| align="center" | MTV Europe Music Award
| align="center" | Best Video
| 
|-
| align="center" | 2000
| align="center" | Grammy Award
| align="center" | Best Dance Recording
| 
|}

Track listings

UK and Australian CD single
 "Praise You" (radio edit)
 "Praise You"
 "Sho Nuff"
 "The Rockafeller Skank" (Mulder's Urban Takeover Remix)

UK 12-inch single
A. "Praise You"
AA. "Sho Nuff"

UK cassette single
 "Praise You" (radio edit)
 "The Rockafeller Skank" (Mulder's Urban Takeover Remix)

European CD single
 "Praise You" (radio edit)
 "Praise You" (full version)

US CD, 12-inch, and cassette single
 "Praise You"
 "Sho Nuff"
 "The Rockafeller Skank" (Mulder's Urban Takeover Remix)

Japanese CD single
 "Praise You" (full version)
 "Sho Nuff"
 "The Rockafeller Skank" (Mulder's Urban Takeover Remix)
 "Praise You" (radio edit)
 "How Can You Hear Us?"

Charts

Weekly charts

Year-end charts

Certifications

Release history

Other versions

A 2017 version, arranged and produced by Jennifer Ann Keller, was recorded by Hannah Grace and the London Contemporary Voices Choir for a Lloyds Bank advertising campaign. Grace's version of "Praise You" has been used in numerous TV programmes, including The X Factor, and has sold in excess of 60,000 copies in the UK. Grace’s version includes an extra refrain which includes lyrics from Camille Yarborough's original song.

In 2018 a remix by Purple Disco Machine was released, which made it to number one on the US Billboard Dance Club Songs chart.

In 2013, a version of Praise You appeared on Robert Randolph Presents: The Slide Brothers, a group that embodies sacred steel to encompass blues, rock and soul.  The Slide Brothers featuring Shemekia Copeland appeared on the Conan O'Brien Show (Live)

Usage in media and pop culture
 In the 1999 film Cruel Intentions, the song is playing in the scene when Sebastian and Annette drive back from doing charity work at the nursing home.
 The season 3 finale of the NBC sitcom Suddenly Susan uses the song during a montage that pays tribute to cast member David Strickland, who had committed suicide earlier in the season.
 In November 2017, an American TV advertisement for Forevermark Diamonds featured a cover of the Hannah Grace version, sung by Jon Kenzie.
 Meal delivery service Grubhub used an instrumental version of the song in a 2020 animated TV commercial.
 In 2020, a TV commercial for Advil features Grace's version.
 In season 3, episode 20 of Buffy the Vampire Slayer at minute 29:50, the song plays during the Sunnydale High School prom.
 In the Derry Girls Season 3 finale Halloween (which revolves around a Fatboy Slim concert), the song plays in the end, with a female vocal-led rendition after Claire's father dies in the hospital, and the subsequent funeral procession.

References

1998 songs
1999 singles
2018 singles
Astralwerks singles
Fatboy Slim songs
MTV Video Music Award for Best Direction
Music videos directed by Spike Jonze
Number-one singles in Iceland
Number-one singles in Scotland
Songs written by Norman Cook
Skint Records singles
UK Independent Singles Chart number-one singles
UK Singles Chart number-one singles